Jayden De'Chante Richardson (born 4 September 2000) is an English professional footballer who plays as a right back for Aberdeen.

Career

Nottingham Forest
After impressing as part of the Nottingham Forest academy, Richardson signed his first professional contract with the club in April 2019. He was named as part of the first team squad ahead of the 2019–20 season.

Loan to Exeter City
On 16 August 2019, Richardson joined League Two side Exeter City on a season-long loan. He made his professional debut on 20 August 2019, starting a 0–0 draw against Oldham Athletic. He scored his first professional goal against the same club, the first goal in a 5–1 win for Exeter.

Loan to Forest Green Rovers
On 23 September 2020, Richardson signed for League Two club Forest Green Rovers on a season-long loan.

Loan to Notts County
On 7 December 2021, Richardson joined National League side Notts County on a one-month loan deal.
His loan was extended in January 2022 until the end of season.

Aberdeen
On 20 June 2022, Richardson signed with Scottish Premiership side Aberdeen.

Career statistics

References

2000 births
Living people
Footballers from Nottingham
English footballers
Association football defenders
Nottingham Forest F.C. players
Exeter City F.C. players
Forest Green Rovers F.C. players
Notts County F.C. players
Aberdeen F.C. players
English Football League players
National League (English football) players
Scottish Professional Football League players